Ciudad Guzmán (also known as simply Guzmán) is a city in the Mexican state of Jalisco. 
Its population totaled 97,750 in the 2010 census, ranking as the eighth-largest city in the state.

Ciudad Guzmán is the municipal seat of Zapotlán el Grande municipality, which has an area of 295.29 km² (114.0 sq.mi). The municipality's population was 96,050 in the same census.

History
Prior to the arrival of the European Spanish Conquistadors, this area was the pre-Columbian kingdom of Zapotlán and was at different times under the domain of the nearby kingdoms of Colima and Michoacán.

Zapotlán el Grande was conquered in 1526. Many treasures and weapons are said to be buried throughout the town's old colonial homes, buildings, and farms.

In the mid-19th century, the name of the town was changed from Zapotlán el Grande to Ciudad Guzmán, after the Mexican federalist insurgent Gordiano de Guzmán.

The town has been nicknamed the "Athens of Jalisco" because it's the birthplace of several well-known intellectuals and artists, including the muralist José Clemente Orozco, the composer Consuelo Velázquez, the scientist José María Arreola and the journalist and historian Juan José Arreola.

The oldest part of the city, in the downtown area, holds a major stone Cathedral (Catedral de San José) that local folklore says is haunted. Ciudad Guzmán is located in an area of high seismic activity. The cathedral's towers have tumbled down several times due to earthquakes, sometimes killing people, and their souls are said to guard the place.

The last time the towers collapsed was on September 19, 1985, during the 1985 Mexico City earthquake, an earthquake of magnitude 8.1 that has come to be considered one of the most devastating natural disasters of the 20th century. In Guzmán City, it left more than 50 people dead and about 1,000 injured. The cathedral towers were never rebuilt to their majestic height.

Climate
Ciudad Guzman has a humid subtropical climate (Köppen climate classification Cwa) with distinct dry and wet seasons. In contrast, the dry season has little precipitation and cooler temperatures but the weather can be foggy, especially from October to January. Frosts can occasionally occur on the coldest nights but extended periods of frosts are rare.

Sister cities 
Guzmán is a sister city of these municipalities:
 Longmont, Colorado, United States. Lake Havasu City, Arizona, United States.

References

Ciudad Guzmán, el trágico recuerdo Noticieros Televisa.

External links
Link to tables of population data from Census of 2005 INEGI: Instituto Nacional de Estadística, Geografía e Informática
Jalisco Enciclopedia de los Municipios de México
Administración Pública Municipal de Zapotlán el Grande Official website
Sociales en Ciudad Guzman
El Sur - Newspaper 
Alva Technology - Web Hosting
F R O B U R G - Blogger in Ciudad Guzmán

Populated places in Jalisco
Populated places established in the 16th century